The following is a list of films originally produced and/or distributed theatrically by Metro-Goldwyn-Mayer and released between 1990 and 1999.

(company known as MGM-Pathe Communications Co., Metro-Goldwyn-Mayer Inc., MGM/UA Distribution Co. and Metro-Goldwyn-Mayer Pictures)

See also 
 Lists of Metro-Goldwyn-Mayer films

References 

1990-1999
American films by studio
1990s in American cinema
Lists of 1990s films